At the 2002 Commonwealth Games, the athletics events were held at the City of Manchester Stadium on 26–30 July 2002. The route for the marathon event crossed Manchester city centre and finished in the stadium. The race walk events began alongside the Lowry Centre at Salford Quays. There were twenty-five men's events and 23 women's events; the schedules were identical except that there were men's 3000 metres steeplechase and 50 kilometres walk events. Pole vaulter Dominic Johnson won a bronze medal, Saint Lucia's only medal of the Games.

Sixteen Games records were bettered over the course of the competition, and two further records were set in the disability events.

Medal summary

Men

Women
Track and road events

* Athletes who ran in heats and received medals.
Field and combined events

Disability events

Medal table
Retrieved from 2002 Manchester Commonwealth Games Official Website.

Participating nations

References

External links
2002 Athletics results from official website
Results from BBC

 
2002
Commonwealth Games
Athletics in Greater Manchester
2002 Commonwealth Games events
International athletics competitions hosted by England